The Eugenia Apartments in southeast Portland in the U.S. state of Oregon is a two-story apartment building listed on the National Register of Historic Places. A Colonial Revival structure built in 1911, it was added to the register in 1989.

The nomination form for the building describes it as a well-preserved example of the many medium-scale multi-family dwellings built in inner southeast Portland between 1910 and 1930. The Eugenia Apartments has four apartments on each of its main floors as well as three living units in the basement. Pedimented and arched dormers, a formal facade and prominent portico, and decorative details such as fanlights are among the building's notable features.

See also
 National Register of Historic Places listings in Southeast Portland, Oregon

References

External links
 

1911 establishments in Oregon
Buckman, Portland, Oregon
Portland Eastside MPS
Residential buildings completed in 1911
Apartment buildings on the National Register of Historic Places in Portland, Oregon
Portland Historic Landmarks